Majlis Bandaraya Johor Bahru Football Club or simply known as MBJB FC is a Malaysian football club based in Johor Bahru, Johor. The club represents Johor Bahru City Council in Malaysia football.

In 2009, the club was booted out from Malaysia Premier League after only playing five matches citing its failure to settle insurance dues before the given date.

The team were promoted back to Premier League for the second time in 2012, having finished 2011 Malaysia FAM League as runners-up. This time, their campaign lasted only a season when they finished last in the 12-team league and relegated straight back to FAM League, garnering only 5 points, scoring only 18 goals while conceding 79 goals.

After the 2012 season, the Johor Football Association made a re-structuring plan to allow only two teams to represent the state of Johor in the Malaysia Football League. Thus, MBJB FC and MP Muar FC were to be playing in the PBNJ State League.

Honours
 Malaysia FAM Cup
Runners-up: 2008, 2011

Officials
Senior Officials
 Advisor:  -
 President:  -
 Board of directors:  -
 Vice-President:  -
 Chief executive:  -
 Chief operating:  -
 Managing director:  -
 Commercial director:  -
 Deputy President 1:  -
 Deputy President 2:  -
 Secretary-General:  Mohd Afeza Ramli
 Deputy Secretary-General:  -
 Treasurer:  -

Team Officials
 Team Manager:  -
 Assistant Team Manager:  -
 Technical Adviser:  -
 Head Coach:  -
 Assistant Head Coach :  -
 Coach :  -
 Goalkeeper Coach :  -
 President's Cup Team Manager:  -
 President's Cup Head Coach :  -
 Physiotherapist:  -
 Coordinator:  -
 Team Asstistant Coordinator:  -

Players

For recent transfers, see List of Malaysian football transfers 2012

Staff

Manager

Coach

References

External links
 MBJB FC Soccerway

Malaysia FAM League clubs
Malaysia Premier League clubs
Football clubs in Malaysia
Johor Darul Ta'zim F.C.
Sport in Johor